Francis Barry Byrne (December 19, 1883 – December 18, 1967) was a member of the group of architects known as the Prairie School.  After the demise of the Prairie School, about 1914 to 1916, Byrne continued as a successful architect by developing his own style.

Biography
Byrne was born and raised in Chicago.  After seeing a Chicago Architectural Club exhibit in 1902, he sought employment with Frank Lloyd Wright and secured an apprentice position although he was untrained in architecture. As Wright’s son, John, relates:

After working for Wright in his Oak Park, Illinois studio between 1902 and 1907, Byrne worked briefly at other Chicago firms. He moved to Seattle in winter 1908 to 1909 to join Andrew Willatzen who had been a fellow employee at Wright's office. They formed the firm Willatzen & Byrne and, over the next several years, produced a series of residential designs in the Prairie School style.

After the Willatzen & Byrne partnership dissolved in 1913, Willatzen remained in Seattle but Byrne moved to southern California where he lived briefly with Wright's sons Lloyd Wright and John Lloyd Wright. In 1914, he returned to Chicago at first to manage, then, take over the practice of Walter Burley Griffin who had moved to Australia to develop plans for its new capital city, Canberra.

By 1917, Byrne was practicing under his own name.  He briefly served in World War I, then returned to Chicago. Byrne's style developed independently of Wright and the Prairie School as he moved toward greater simplification of form. Annette Cremin became Byrne's wife in 1926, and they had three children: Ann, Cathleen and Patrick. As an artist, Annette influenced his work, drawing renderings of his architectural designs, and on occasion, contributing interior color patterns and decoration for his buildings and churches. During the depression when there was no demand for his services, she supported the family.

During the 1920s, some of Byrne's work contained elements of Expressionism. He became successful as a designer of ecclesiastical and educational buildings for the Roman Catholic Church, for whom he later created three of his most important works: Church of Christ the King in Turners Cross, Cork, Ireland (1931), Church of St. Francis Xavier in Kansas City, Missouri (1949), and St. Benedict's Abbey in Atchison, Kansas (1951-1957).

In the 1930s, Byrne moved to New York, but after 1945 returned to Chicago.   Byrne partially retired about 1953, but continued to accept commissions until his death.

He died on the eve of his 84th birthday after being struck crossing the street to attend Mass with his wife by an automobile driven by retired president of the American League Will Harridge. He is buried at Calvary Cemetery in Evanston, Illinois. Annette Cremin Byrne died in 1990,  aged 92.

Archival materials are held by the Ryerson & Burnham Libraries in the Art Institute of Chicago.

Selected works

 Nelson, Tagholm and Jensen Building, Seattle, Washington (1909) with Andrew Willatzen
 Charles H. Clarke House, Seattle, Washington (1909) with Andrew Willatzen
 Frederick Handschy House Seattle, Washington (1910) with Andrew Willatzen
 Our Lady of Good Help Catholic Church, Hoquiam, Washington (1910) with Andrew Willatzen
 George Matzen House, Seattle, Washington (1910), with Andrew Willatzen
 Oscar E. Maurer House, Seattle, Washington (1910) with Andrew Willatzen
 Andrew S. Kerry House, Seattle, Washington (1910–11) with Andrew Willatzen
 George E. Felmlay House, Seattle, Washington (1911) with Andrew Willatzen
 John T. McVay House, Seattle, Washington (1911) with Andrew Willatzen
 Carleton Huiscamp House, Seattle, Washington (1912) with Andrew Willatzen
 George Bellman House, Seattle, Washington (1912) with Andrew Willatzen
 L. George Hagar House, Seattle, Washington (1913) with Andrew Willatzen
 Sam Schneider House, Mason City, Iowa (1914), attributed (original commission to Walter Burley Griffin)
 J.B. Franke House, Fort Wayne, Indiana (1914)
 Hugh Gilmore House, Mason City, Iowa (1915)
 Dr. James Frederic Clarke House, Fairfield, Iowa (1915)
 John Travis Kenna Apartments, Chicago, Illinois (1916)
 C.M. Rich House, Keokuk, Iowa (1916)
 Saint Francis Xavier School, Wilmette, Illinois (1916)
 Old Chemistry Hall, University of New Mexico, Albuquerque, New Mexico (1916)
 John Valentine House (now Sigma Tau Gamma fraternity house, Ball State University), Muncie, Indiana (1917)
 William F. Temple House remodeling, Kenilworth, Illinois (1917), with Alfonso Iannelli
 Immaculata High School and Convent Buildings, Chicago (1922), historic landmark
 St. Francis Xavier High School, Wilmette, Illinois (1922)
 Church of St. Thomas the Apostle, Chicago, Illinois (1922)
 All Saints Cemetery, Des Plaines, Illinois (1923)
St. Catherine's High School, Racine, Wisconsin (1923)
 St. Patrick's Roman Catholic Church, Racine, Wisconsin (1924)
 Church of Christ the King, Tulsa, Oklahoma (1926)
 Church of Christ the King, Parish of Turners Cross, Cork, Ireland (1931), sculpture by John Storrs
 Church of SS. Peter & Paul, Pierre, South Dakota (1941)
 Church of St. Francis Xavier, Kansas City, Missouri (1949), with Joseph B Shaughnessy Sr.  sculptures by Alfonso Iannelli
 St. Columba Church, St. Paul, Minnesota (1949)
 St. Benedict's Abbey Church, Atchison, Kansas (1951-1957)
 Church of St. Patrick, London, Ontario (1952)
 Holy Redeemer College (now Académie Sainte-Cécile), Windsor, Ontario (1957)
 St. Procopius College (now Benedictine University), Lisle, Illinois (1962)

References

Further reading
 Brooks, H. Allen (Ed.), Prairie School Architecture: Studies from "The Western Architect", Van Nostrand Reinhold Co., New York 1983;  
 Brooks, H. Allen, The Prairie School: Frank Lloyd Wright and his Midwest Contemporaries, University of Toronto Press, Toronto 1972;  
 Hildebrand, Grant, and Giessel Jess M., "Andrew Willatsen," in Shaping Seattle Architecture:  A Historical Guide to the Architects (ed. Jeffrey Karl Ochsner), University of Washington Press, Seattle and London 1994, pages 168-173, 312;  
 Michael, Vincent L. The Architecture of Barry Byrne: Taking the Prairie School to Europe (University of Illinois Press; 2013) 226 pages;

External links
Byrne Biography and Buildings
Prairie Styles - Barry Byrne
ArchiSeek: Barry Byrne: Christ the King, Turner's Cross, Cork
 Francis Barry Byrne works. Held by the Department of Drawings & Archives, Avery Architectural & Fine Arts Library, Columbia University.

1883 births
1967 deaths
20th-century American architects
Architects from Chicago
Benedictine University
Architects of Roman Catholic churches